The Guilford Courthouse Flag is the name given to a North Carolina militia banner which was reported to have flown at the Battle of Guilford Courthouse (March 15, 1781, Greensboro, North Carolina).  The flag is recognizable by the reverse colors normally seen on American flags: red and blue stripes in the field with eight-pointed blue stars on an elongated white canton.

The unique colors and dimensions are sometimes described as showing a lack of uniformity in a young nation at war, with a poor infrastructure and bad communication.  However, it was common practice during the Revolution for military units to carry flags that featured common American symbols (such as stripes and stars), but to make them uniquely identifiable for use as a company or regimental flag.  As such, this flag was probably never intended for use as a national flag.

The original flag has been preserved since 1914 in the collection of the North Carolina Museum of History in Raleigh, North Carolina.  It measures 42 inches high and 100 inches on the fly.  The canton is 35 inches high and 73 inches long.  The stars are 8 inches in diameter and have eight points.  It is considered the oldest surviving example of an American flag with eight-pointed stars.

History
The flag was presented to the Grand Masonic Lodge of North Carolina in 1909 by Micajah Bullock's son, Edward, who was 81 years old at the time. While there is no historic documentation of the flag being used in the battle and studies of the flag suggest that it may have had 15 stars and 15 stripes at one time, either originally made or perhaps added on when U.S. flags had 15 stripes.  The use of cotton cloth as the primary fabric is evidence of post-1790 construction. These factors cause some to question the validity of the Bullock story.  However, Al Hoilman, curator of Political and Socio-Economic History at the museum, has studied the reports on the controversy and believes the flag could have been flown at the battle. “It (story of the flag) smacks of truth to me,” he says.
The Micajah Bullock chapter of North Carolina's DAR has collected extensive writings and records which lead to conclude based on the age of the fabric and no real evidence that any other stars were ever on the flag confirm the flag is real.  While it may be an item of controversy, the family's documents record Micajah returning home weary from battle carrying the flag.  Upon his passing, his son Edward was entrusted with its care.  When copies of this design are sold or flown today, it is generally accepted as symbolic of the American Revolution and, specifically, the battle itself.

References

Cooper, Grace Rogers Thirteen Star Flags 1973.  Smithsonian Institution Press.  Available online (21.7 MB).
Mastai, Boleslaw and Marie-Louise D'Otrange The Stars and the Stripes. The American Flag as Art and as History from the Birth of the Republic to the Present ©1973. Alfred A. Knopf, New York. 
National Park Service, The North Carolina Militia Flag

Flags of the American Revolution